Kim Sundlöv  (born 30 August 1990) is a Swedish football defender who currently plays for Stabæk.

Honours 
Åland United
Runner-up
 Naisten Liiga: 2014

External links 
 
 

1990 births
Living people
Swedish women's footballers
Åland United players
Djurgårdens IF Fotboll (women) players
Damallsvenskan players
Women's association football defenders
Kansallinen Liiga players
Sundsvalls DFF players
Stabæk Fotball Kvinner players
Sandvikens IF players
Toppserien players
Expatriate women's footballers in Norway
Expatriate women's footballers in Finland
Swedish expatriate sportspeople in Norway
Swedish expatriate sportspeople in Finland